The 2012–13 Topklasse season is the third edition of the Dutch third tier since its inauguration in the current form in 2010. A total 32 teams are participating in the league: 24 from the 2011–12 Topklasse, and the remaining eight from the 2011–12 Hoofdklasse. As usual, the competition is divided into two leagues: "Saturday" and "Sunday", who differ by the day their games are usually played.

For the second consecutive season, no team was relegated from the Eerste Divisie, this time due to the fact all 2011–12 Topklasse have declined promotion into professionalism.

Teams

Saturday league

Sunday league

League tables

Saturday league

Sunday league

Championship play-offs

Katwijk won the overall Topklasse title. Katwijk didn't apply to promote to the Eerste Divisie, Achilles '29 did. Therefore, Achilles was promoted to the 2013–14 Eerste Divisie.

Promotion/relegation play-offs

Topklasse / Hoofdklasse playoff semifinals

Topklasse / Hoofdklasse playoff finals

Because Achilles '29 promoted to the 2013–14 Eerste Divisie, there was an extra spot in the 2013–14 Sunday Topklasse. Therefore, Juliana '31 and Haaglandia didn't have to play the playoff final, as they were both qualified for the 2013-14 Topklasse. Spakenburg won the playoffs for the Saturday Topklasse and were not relegated.

References

Derde Divisie seasons
Neth
3